Ngaka Modiri Molema District Municipality (formerly Central District Municipality) is one of the four districts of North West province in South Africa. Its capital is Mafeking, which is also the capital of the province.

Geography

Neighbours
Ngaka Modiri Molema District has the following neighbours:
 The Republic of Botswana to the north
 Dr Ruth Segomotsi Mompati District Municipality to the west
 Dr Kenneth Kaunda District Municipality to the south
 Bojanala Platinum District Municipality district to the east
 Waterberg District Municipality (Limpopo province) to the north-east

Local municipalities 
The district contains the following local municipalities:

Demographics
The following statistics are from the 2011 census.

Gender

Ethnic group

Age

Politics

Election results 
Election results for Ngaka Modiri Molema District in the South African general election, 2004. 
 Population 18 and over: 446 018 [58.46% of total population] 
 Total votes: 254 874 [33.40% of total population] 
 Voting % estimate: 57.14% votes as a % of population 18 and over

References

External links
 Official website

District Municipalities of North West (South African province)
Ngaka Modiri Molema District Municipality